Yandamuri Veerendranath is an Indian novelist and screenwriter known for his works in the Telugu language. He influences younger generations with his socially relevant writings and youtube videos. In his writings he addresses many of social problems in India like poverty, prejudices, and superstitions, and encourages people to be socially responsible. He successfully bridges the idealistic and the popular styles of literature. He is also a Chartered Accountant by qualification.

Personal life
Yandamuri Veerendranath is from East Godavari district of Andhra Pradesh. He is a practicing chartered accountant. He worked for 15 years in various financial institutions as a senior executive.
He is an acclaimed novelist, playwright, and State Sahitya Academy award winner. His works have been translated into Tamil, Kannada, Malayalam, English, and Hindi. He is a motivational speaker and has delivered speeches at Australia, Tanzania, Indonesia, Singapore, US and, the UK. He is a movie director. He directed films with artists like Chiranjeevi, Ramya Krishna etc.
He is associated with more than 30 films that include 'Abhilasha' (అభిలాష), 'Challenge' (ఛాలెంజ్) and ‘Jagadeka Veerudu Athiloka Sundari’ (జగదేక వీరుడు అతిలోక సుందరి).. His another popular novel Tulasi Dalam was first adapted into a Kannada movie (1985)  titled Thulasidala and later in Telugu as Tulasidalam (1989),in Hindi as Phoonk (2008) and its remake in Telugu as Raksha (2008). His TV Serials won Golden Nandi awards for best direction and production. His film, 'oka Voori Katha (ఒక ఊరి కథ)’ won best regional film award from President of India. His film Vennelloa Aadapilla (వెన్నెల్లో ఆడపిల్ల) won Film fare award.
In an opinion poll in 1982 conducted by Andhrajyoti, he was one among "4 most popular persons" of the state, others being N.T. Ramarao etc. His book 'Success in Five Steps' holds an all-time record in Telugu literature, surpassing sales of more than two crore rupees.
He built an ashram at Kakinada, a one-crore project to teach the importance of education to tribal students free of cost.

Popular culture
Many of his novels have been made into motion pictures in Telugu. He also directed two movies in Telugu, the first being Agnipravesam, starring Yamuna, and the second movie with Chiranjeevi by name, Stuvartpuram Police Station. Both the stories were based on his own novels but not received well by the audience. Hence, Veerendranath reverted to writing. His TV serials won Nandi awards, and film fare award. His film Beladingala Baale (Kannada - ಬೆಳದಿಂಗಳ ಬಾಲೆ) won Karnataka state best film award:

Awards

In addition to financial success, he has won many awards for his work. His first film as a dialogue writer won a best regional award from the President of India.

 State Sahitya Academy Award for Raghupati Raghava Rajaram in 1982. 
 Nandi Award as Best Director for the teleserial Vennello Adapilla in 1996.
 Nandi Award as Best Socially Relevant Tele-Film for Vijayam Vaipu Payanam in 2002 and many more.

Bibliography

He is passionate about motivating students and gave around 1000 motivational speeches all over India and abroad. Latest he was involved in motivating around 40000 Sc/St financially poor students all over Andhra Pradesh at 13 District headquarters.

Films
 Oka Oori Katha(Mrinal sen/ Best regional film national award)
 Manchu Pallaki(Chiranjeevi)
 Sampoorna Premayanam (Sobhan Babu)
 Abhilasha(Chiranjeevi)
 Challenge (Chiranjeevi)
 Kashmora (Rajendra Prasad, Bhanupriya)
 Rakshasudu (Chiranjeevi)
 Marana Mrudangam (Chiranjeevi)
 Oka Radha Iddaru Krishnulu (Kamal Hasan, Sridevi)
 Donga Mogudu (Chiranjeevi)
 Raktabhishekam (Balakrishna)
 Aakhari Poratam (Nagarjuna, Sridevi)
 Stuartpuram Police Station (Chiranjeevi)
 Muthyamantha Muddu (Rajendra Prasad)
 Jagadeka Veerudu Athiloka Sundari (Chiranjeevi)
 Beladingala Baale (Kannada film)
 Punnami Naagu
 Bunny n Cherry (2013)

Fiction

 Dega Rekkala Chappudu
 Veellani Em Chedham?
 Rendu Gundela Chappudu
 Oka Varshakalapu Sayantram
 Siggesthondhi
 Ankitham
 Maro Hiroshima
 Prema
 Anaithikam
 Dhyeyam
 The Dairy of Miss Sharadha
 Priyuralu Piliche
 Vennello Aadapilla
 Manchu Parvatham
 Bharya Gunavathi Shathru
 Nallanchu Thellacheera
 Swara Bhethalam
 Sampoorna Premayanam
 Kaasanova 99
 Antharmukham
 Dabbu Minus Dabbu
 Stuvartpuram Police Station
 Cheekatlo Suryudu
 Dabbu to the Power of Dabbu
 Anando Brahmma
 Ashtavakra
 Chengalva Poodhanda
 Dhuppatlo Minnagu
 Yugantham
 Rushi
 Nishabdham - Neeku Naku Madhya
 Thulasidhalam
 Thulasi
 Athade Aame Sainyam
 13-14-15
 Athadu Aame Priyudu
 Ladies Hostel
 Agni Pravesham
 Rudhranetra
 Rakshasudu
 Aakhari Poratam
 Marana Mrudhangam
 Prardhana
 Abhilasha
 Raktha Sindhuram
 Thriller
 Vennello Godhari
 Parnashala
 Oka Raadha Idharu Krishnulu
 Best of Veerendranath (Kathalu)
 Radha Kunthi
 Kshaminchu Supriya!

Non-fiction

 Popular Rachanalu Cheyatam Ela!?
 Manchi Muthyalu
 Padamati Koyila Pallavi
 Graphology
 Mimmalni Mee Pillalu Preminchalante
 Meeru Manchi Ammayi Kaadu
 Mimmalni Meeru Gelavagalaru
 Vijayam Vaipu Payanam
 Pillala Perla Prapancham
 Chaduvu – Ekagratha
 Vijayamlo Bhagaswamyam
 Mind Power – No.1 Avatam Ela?
 Vijayaniki 5 Metlu
 Vijayaniki Aro Mettu
 Tappu Cheddaam Randi
 Vijaya Rahasyaalu
 Manchu Poola Varsham
 Idli Orchid Aakaasham
 Bethala Prasnalu
 The 5 Steps to Success*(English translation of his best-selling book Vijayaniki 5 Metlu) 5
 The Art of Studying

Career
Veerendranath did Chartered Accountancy and started his career at Andhra Pradesh State Finance Corporation. He worked there for 5 years. Later he moved to Andhra Bank and worked as the head of Small Scale Industries Division. Some of his works are available as e-books

See also
 List of Indian writers

References

Indian male novelists
Living people
People from East Godavari district
Telugu writers
Novelists from Andhra Pradesh
Telugu screenwriters
20th-century Indian novelists
Screenwriters from Andhra Pradesh
20th-century Indian male writers
1948 births